Batrachideinae is a subfamily of groundhoppers or pygmy grasshoppers. There are thought to be 20 genera in Batrachideinae, with genera found in the Americas, Africa, (mostly tropical) Asia and Australia.

Genera
About 25 genera in three tribes belong to the subfamily Batrachideinae:

Batrachideini
Auth. Bolívar, 1887 - Americas
 Batrachidea Serville, 1838 c g
 Cranotettix Grant, 1955 c g
 Danatettix Thomas, Skejo & Heads, 2019
 Eutettigidea Hancock, 1914 c g
 Halmatettix Hancock, 1909 c g
 Lophoscirtus Bruner, 1910 c g
 Paurotarsus Hancock, 1900 c g
 Paxilla Bolívar, 1887 i c g
 Plectronotus Morse, 1900 c g
 Puiggaria Bolívar, 1887 c g
 Rehnidium Grant, 1956 c g
 Scaria Bolívar, 1887 c g
 Tettigidea Scudder, 1862 i c g b

Bufonidini
Auth. Hancock, 1907 - Australasia
 Anaselina Storozhenko, 2019
 Bufonides Bolívar, 1898 c g
 Hyperyboella Günther, 1938
 Paraselina Storozhenko, 2019
 Selivinga Storozhenko, 2019
 Vilma Steinmann, 1973 c g
 Vingselina Sjöstedt, 1921 c g

Cassitettigini
Auth. Yin, 1984 - Africa, tropical Asia
 Ascetotettix Grant, 1956 c g
 Palaioscaria Günther, 1936 c g
 Phloeonotus Bolívar, 1887 c g
 Saussurella Bolívar, 1887 c g
 Wiemersiella Tumbrinck, 2014 c g

Data sources: i = ITIS, c = Catalogue of Life, g = GBIF, b = Bugguide.net

References

Further reading

External links

 

Tetrigidae
Articles created by Qbugbot